is a Japanese screenwriter of scenarios for several anime, drama CDs, video games as well as novels.

Filmography

 series head writer denoted in bold

TV series
 Piano: The Melody of a Young Girl’s Heart (2002–2003)
 Weiß Kreuz Glühen (2003)
 Dokkoida (2003)
 Ninja Nonsense (2004)
 Futakoi Alternative (2005)
 Coyote Ragtime Show (2006)
 Kage Kara Mamoru! (2006)
 Gakuen Utopia Manabi Straight! (2007)
 Koi suru Tenshi Angelique~Kagayaki no Ashita~ (2007)
 Shugo Chara! (2007–2008)
 Noramimi (2008)
 Queen’s Blade: The Exiled Virgin (2009)
 Ikki Tousen: Xtreme Xecutor (2010)
 Aesthetica of a Rogue Hero (2012)
 Bladedance of Elementalers (2014)
 Ulysses: Jeanne d'Arc and the Alchemist Knight (2018)
 Märchen Mädchen (2018–2019)
 GeGeGe no Kitarō 6th series (2018–2020)
 Healin' Good Pretty Cure (2020–2021)
 World Trigger (2021)
 Police in a Pod (2022)
 Soaring Sky! Pretty Cure (2023)
 AI no Idenshi (TBA)

OVAs
 Tales of Phantasia: The Animation (2004–2006)
 Gakuen Utopia Manabi Straight!: It’s Summer! It’s Manabi! It’s a Training Camp! (2007)
 Tales of Symphonia: The Animation 
 Sylvarant Episode (2007)
 Tethe'alla Episode (2010–2011)
 The United World Episode (2011–2012)
 Queen’s Blade: Vanquished Queens (2013)
 Queen’s Blade Unlimited (2018, 2020)

Films
 Healin' Good Pretty Cure the Movie: GoGo! Big Transformation! The Town of Dreams (2021)
 Tropical-Rouge! Pretty Cure the Movie: Petite Dive! Collaboration Dance Party! (2021)

Drama CDs
Tales of Series
Tales of Phantasia
Tales of Phantasia (3 CDs)
Anthology (2 CDs)
Narikiri Dungeon (2 CDs)
Panic World (1 CD)
Tales of Eternia
Tales of Destiny
Proust Forgotten Chronicle (1 CD)
Tales of Destiny 2 (5 CDs)
Tales of Symphonia
A LONG TIME AGO (3 CDs)
Rodeo Ride Tour (2 CDs)
Tales of Rebirth (4 CDs)
Tales of the Abyss
Tales of Fandom
"(Chotto) Shiawase Nikki" (1 CD)
Tales Ring Archive (2 CDs)

References

External links
Ryunosuke Kingetsu's personal website 
 

1971 births
Living people
Japanese writers